Erdan Island (Erhtan Island) (also ) is an island in Lieyu Township, Kinmen County (Quemoy), Taiwan. The island has been called Seao-tan.

History

On February 21, 1942, more than fifty anti-Japanese dissidents were taken to the island, tortured and killed in a mass execution.

Chinese Nationalist spokesmen reported that Chinese Communists shelled Dadan and Erdan between June 26–28, 1957. At that time, Chinese Nationalist strength on the islands was around 1,100 men.

On September 6, 2011, President Ma Ying-jeou visited with the troops stationed on Erdan Island.

In November 2013, the island was designated as battlefield culture landscape by the Cultural Affairs Bureau of Kinmen County Government. The island was handed over from Kinmen Defense Command of the Republic of China Armed Forces to the county government on 1 July 2014.

Geography

The islands of Wu Yu and Qing Yu in Gangwei, Longhai City, Zhangzhou, Fujian, China are located to the south of Erdan Island.

Tourist attractions
 Erdan Hero Tunnel

See also
 List of islands of Taiwan
 Dadan Island

References

Islands of Fujian, Republic of China
Landforms of Kinmen County
Lieyu Township